Scooba may refer to:

 Scooba (brand), a cleaning robot belonging to iRobot Corporation
 Scooba, Mississippi, United States

See also
 Scuba (disambiguation)